The 2020 Alaska House of Representatives election was held on Tuesday, November 3, 2020, with the primary election on August 18, 2020. Voters in the 40 districts of the Alaska House of Representatives elected their representatives, in conjunction with state senate elections and the biennial United States elections for federal offices.

Background
Following the previous state House elections in 2018, Republicans nominally gained a majority in the chamber. When the House convened to commence its regular session in January 2019, a power struggle resulted in a lengthy delay in organizing itself. Eventually, all fifteen Democratic members formed a coalition with the two independents including Bryce Edgmon (elected as a Democrat) and eight dissident Republicans to re-elect Edgmon as Speaker, a total of twenty-five members. In May and July 2019, Republicans Gabrielle LeDoux (District 15) and Tammie Wilson (District 3) left the Coalition, respectively, dropping its members down to twenty-three.

Predictions

Overview

Summary of results

Close races
Seats where the margin of victory was under 10%:
  gain
 
  gain
 
  gain

Retiring incumbents
Three incumbent Representatives (two Republicans and one Democrat) chose not to seek reelection.
Dave Talerico (R), District 6
Colleen Sullivan-Leonard (R), District 7
John Lincoln (D), District 40

Incumbents defeated

In primary election
Six incumbent Representatives (all Republicans) were defeated in the August 18 primaries.
Sharon Jackson (R), District 13
Jennifer Johnston (Coalition R), District 28
Gary Knopp (Coalition R), District 30
Chuck Kopp (Coalition R), District 24
Gabrielle LeDoux (R), District 15
Mark Neuman (R), District 8

In general election
Two incumbents (both Republicans) sought reelection but were defeated in the general election.
Mel Gillis (R), District 25
Lance Pruitt (R), District 27

Detailed results

District 1
AD primary

General election

District 2
Republican primary

General election

District 3

District 4

District 5
AD primary

General election

District 6
Republican primary

General election

District 7
Republican primary

General election

District 8
Republican primary

General election

District 9
Republican primary

General election

District 10
Republican primary

General election

District 11
Republican primary

General election

District 12

District 13
Republican primary

General election

District 14
Democratic nominee Bruce Batten withdrew on August 31.

District 15
Republican primary
Polling

Results

AD primary

General election

District 16
Republican primary

General election

District 17

District 18

District 19

District 20

District 21

District 22
AD primary

General election

District 23
AD primary

Republican primary

General election

District 24
Republican primary

General election

District 25
Republican primary

AD primary

General election

District 26

District 27

District 28
Republican primary

General election
Democratic nominee Adam Lees withdrew on August 31, replaced by independent Anchorage Assemblywoman Suzanne LaFrance.

District 29

District 30
Republican primary

General election

District 31

District 32

District 33

District 34

District 35
Republican primary

General election

District 36

District 37

District 38

District 39
AD primary

General election

District 40

See also
 2020 Alaska elections

Notes

References

External links
 Primary, General and Statewide Special Election Results, Alaska Division of Elections
 
 
  (State affiliate of the U.S. League of Women Voters)
 

House of Representatives
Alaska House
2020